Judith "Judy" Amabile is an American politician and businesswoman serving as a member of the Colorado House of Representatives from the 49th district and, prior to 2023, the 13th district. Elected in November 2020, she assumed office on January 13, 2021.

Education 
Amabile earned a Bachelor of Arts degree and Master of Business Administration from the University of Colorado Boulder.

Career 
Prior to entering politics, Amabile worked as a consultant for Coopers and Lybrand. She also co-founded Product Architects, Inc. and Good Business Colorado. Amabile was elected to the Colorado House of Representatives in November 2020, succeeding former Speaker KC Becker.

Personal life 
Amabile and her husband, Robert Heiberger, had three sons before divorcing. Amabile and her husband have remained business partners after their divorce.

References 

Living people
University of Colorado Boulder alumni
Women state legislators in Colorado
Democratic Party members of the Colorado House of Representatives
Businesspeople from Colorado
People from Boulder, Colorado
21st-century American politicians
21st-century American women politicians
Year of birth missing (living people)